William F. Rose (September 16, 1909– May 29, 1972) was an American illustrator and film poster artist active in the 1930s and 1940s. He is recognized as one of the most distinctive poster artists of the Classical Hollywood era, a time when most film posters featured painted illustrations rather than photography. Rose painted dozens of poster illustrations for RKO Radio Pictures and other studios. As one of the leading designers in RKO's art department, he helped to define the studio's bold visual aesthetic. Although he was prolific, only a fraction of his poster designs have been individually attributed to him. Most of his output remains unidentified. His artwork is prized by collectors, and original prints of his posters have fetched high prices at auction.

One of his most iconic posters is the alternate "StyleB" design for Citizen Kane(1941), which pitched the film as a more conventional romance than it actually was. The poster failed as a marketing ploy but, in hindsight, has been considered superior to the primary "StyleA" design. In posters for films like Out of the Past(1947), Rose made significant contributions to the film noir aesthetic. He also illustrated all the promotional artwork for producer Val Lewton's series of low-budget Bmovies at RKO, most notably the horror film Cat People(1942).

Apart from his work for Hollywood art departments, Rose was also an active illustrator for magazines and paperback fiction. Born and educated in Pittsburgh, Rose resided in Oceanside, New York for most of his professional career. He was married to Miriam Roberts Rose, a pianist, and had two children. In 1972, he died in New York City at the age of 62.

Early life and education
William Frank Rose was born on September 16, 1909, in Pittsburgh, Pennsylvania. He studied at the University of Pittsburgh and the College of Fine Arts at the Carnegie Institute. At Carnegie, he was an editor of student publications and a member of the Jewish fraternity Beta Sigma Rho; he graduated in 1930 with a B.A. in painting and decorating.

Career and artwork
Rose lived and worked in the New York metropolitan area, residing in the suburban hamlet of Oceanside on Long Island. He was a member of the New York-based professional Society of Illustrators, which featured his artwork in its 1945 and 1946 annual exhibitions. His artwork was also displayed at the 1966 Pennsylvania Academy of the Fine Arts annual exhibition.

The majority of Rose's output consisted of illustrations for movie posters, paperback books, and magazines; his contributions to poster art remain his best-remembered work. He produced book cover art for such paperback publishers as Avon, Cardinal Edition, Dell, Permabooks, Pocket Books, Pyramid Books, and Ace Books. His magazine work, to the extent it is known, included illustrations for such publications as The American Magazine, Collier's, Cosmopolitan, Redbook, Today's Woman, Woman, Woman's Day, and the nationally syndicated Sunday magazines This Week and The American Weekly.

Film posters
He was closely identified with RKO Radio Pictures, where he worked in-house for many years. His artwork shaped the "colorful and brash" direction taken by the studio's advertising department. He mostly painted in pastel and watercolor, which were the media typically used in the RKO art department. Aside from RKO, he contributed artwork to Paramount Pictures and Metro-Goldwyn-Mayer (MGM).

Most of his poster work was in the 1930s and 1940s, during the Classic Hollywood era and the peak of the studio system. At that time, most poster artists worked for studio art departments and, as a result, most of these artists' individual contributions went unrecognized; many iconic posters of the period are considered anonymous works. Rose is considered one of the rare poster artists of the period whose individual style has achieved recognition, alongside others like Al Hirschfeld, Alberto Vargas, and Reynold Brown. In 2003, the American Film Institute ranked his alternate poster for Citizen Kane(1941) at no.36 on its "100 Years... 100 American Movie Poster Classics" list.

Rose's illustrations helped to define the visual conventions associated with certain genres of classic Hollywood film. Critics have especially noted his influence on noir and horror iconography. His poster for Out of the Past(1947) typified the noir style, portraying Jane Greer's character as a "invitingly hallucinatory babe" and Robert Mitchum's as a "lovesick, surly chump" with a cigarette hanging out of his mouth. Film historian Eddie Muller called it a "classic poster" that captured the character dynamic of attraction matched with distrust, noting that Greer's "dangling gun is a masterstroke: Is she about to toss it away—or open fire?" Muller cited the poster for Born to Kill(1947) as another important visual touchstone. In the Historical Dictionary of Film Noir, Andrew Spicer praised the Born to Kill poster for its depiction of Lawrence Tierney as a "tough guy" with "stony features" and a "ubiquitous hanging cigarette" in his mouth beside Claire Trevor as "the femme fatale... in the customary long, sheathlike dress". In the horror genre, Rose is credited with the posters for RKO's string of B movies produced by Val Lewton, including Cat People(1942) and The Body Snatcher(1945). Rebello and Allen ranked these posters among the era's finest in the horror genre, equaled only by Karoly Grosz's illustrations for Universal Classic Monsters film posters of the 1930s. Described as "striking" by poster historians Tony Nourmand and Graham Marsh, the poster for Cat People has become one of the "most sought-after [posters] of the horror genre" among collectors, according to auction house Bonhams.

While Rose's artwork was often genre-defining, it could also be genre-defying. Critical appraisals of his posters for Citizen Kane and Cat People have described stylistic clashes between Rose's illustrations and the actual tone, genre, and themes of the advertised films. As advertisements, these posters arguably set misleading expectations for prospective moviegoers, but they have been praised for their bold imagery. Rose's alternate "StyleB" poster for Citizen Kane was part of the studio's efforts to market the film as "more conventional and accessible" to a Middle-American audience, who executives feared would be dissuaded by the film's "highbrow" style. Writing for Heritage Auctions, Jim Halperin and Hector Cantu noted that Rose's "StyleB" poster "sold the film as a more conventional love story" and, compared with the "Style A" poster by a different artist, Rose's design is now "considered by far the more desirable". English writer Matthew Sweet said that the Cat People illustration acquired its "arresting power" through "its rejection of the picture it advertises". Instead of offering a painting in "moody chiaroscuro", which Sweet asserted would have more accurately conveyed the "poetic horror  atmosphere of subtle dread, Rose's decidedly unsubtle illustration boasted "a snarling Panther of the Baskervilles and a red-hot dame in a strapless dress".

Valuation
Some of Rose's paintings and prints have become valuable as collectables. In March 2009, an original linen print of his "style B" Citizen Kane poster sold at auction for $47,800. In 2015, an original Cat People print sold at auction for $10,625.

Rose's other illustrations are also collected, though they have not been valued as highly as his posters. Among collectors of vintage paperbacks, Rose has been considered an especially desirable cover illustrator. In November 2011, Rose's watercolor painting for the cover of the 1961 paperback Woman Missing and Other Stories by Helen Nielsen, bundled with a copy of the book itself, sold at auction for $1,015.75 ( $ in ).

Several original copies of his magazine illustrations for The American Weekly have sold at auction as well. A signed illustration titled "Strike Up the Band"(1951)—a tempera painting depicting Judy Garland and Mickey Rooney in the 1940 film of the same name—was valued at $500  1991 (around $ in ). His illustration "Anna Gould's Bitter Romance"(1950) sold for $632 in 2003 ($ in ), while "Sheba's Secret"(undated) sold for only $87 in 2012.

Personal life and death
Rose was married to Miriam Roberts Rose (née Rubin; – March 8, 1964), a concert pianist from New York. Their wedding took place on October 9, 1935, in Pittsburgh. She gave recitals in both Pennsylvania and New York and worked for many years as a private piano teacher. They had two daughters, Penny and Tina. Miriam Rose died at age 51 at Manhattan's Lenox Hill Hospital on March 8, 1964, survived by her husband and children.

William Rose died at age 62 in New York City on May 29, 1972.

Attributed illustrations

List of film posters attributed to Rose
Rose reportedly illustrated "dozens" of posters for RKO Radio Pictures alone, in addition to work for other studios. However, only a fraction of his posters have been attributed to him. While he is known to have contributed poster art to Paramount Pictures, none of his illustrations for the studio have been attributed.

Poster gallery

List of book covers attributed to Rose
The list below includes book cover illustrations that have been credited to Rose in either an online scan of the original book or a secondary source. It is not necessarily exhaustive.

Paperback cover gallery

List of magazine illustrations attributed to Rose
The list below includes magazine illustrations that have been credited to Rose in a secondary source or a version of the magazine that can be accessed online. It is not necessarily comprehensive.

Magazine illustration gallery

See also

Film poster, poster, and illustration
List of RKO Pictures films
Classical Hollywood cinema

Notes

References

Citations

Sources

Further reading

1909 births
1972 deaths
20th-century American painters
Film poster artists
American magazine illustrators
Artists from Philadelphia
Artists from Pittsburgh
People from Oceanside, New York
University of Pittsburgh alumni
Carnegie Mellon University College of Fine Arts alumni
Jewish American artists
Jewish painters